Village Presbyterian Church is a Presbyterian Church (USA) located in Prairie Village, Kansas. The church was founded in 1949 with 282 members, and has since grown to be one of the largest Presbyterian Churches in America with a reported 4,789 members in 2013. The church's mission statement is “to see and relate to every person in our communities and the world as loved by God.”

History 
Village Presbyterian Church was founded in February 1949 by Dr. Robert H. Meneilly. Prairie Village was a developing suburb in the 1940s with a high concentration of young families, and no Presbyterian church in the area. Meneilly went door-to-door in the emerging suburb to encourage residents to visit, and begin building a congregation before the building was complete. When the church opened for its first service on Sunday, Feb. 13, 1949, they drew 282 members to the congregation. In a report from Walter Cronkite which was previewed in a 1994 article in the Washington Post, Cronkite described Village Presbyterian as an “absolute perfect example of what is happening to churches all over the United States today in the split between the evangelical right and the more mainstream.” On Feb. 5, 2017, Village Church became one church worshiping at two campuses, holding the first worship service at their first satellite campus, Village on Antioch, located at 14895 Antioch Road in Overland Park, Kansas.

Membership 

In 2021, Village Presbyterian had a total of over 4,573 congregational members, which was significantly larger than the average PC(USA) congregation of 175 members. Located on the edge of the wealthy neighborhood of Mission Hills, Kansas, the congregation regularly donates large sums of money to the church. In 2013, the congregation contributed a total of $4,147,189, compared to the average PC(USA) church's annual contribution of $243,563. The church reported a total enrollment in their Christian education program of 2,642 compared to the average 99 in 2013. The average worship attendance in 2021 was 1,214.

Worship services

Traditional 
Traditional worship services are regularly held online each Sunday at 9 and 11 a.m. These services include a sermon, traditional hymns and church announcements. Sermons are archived with transcripts as well as videos of the service, and saved on Village Presbyterian's website.

"The Gathering" 
The Gathering is a contemporary worship service regularly held at 5 p.m. Sundays. Described as  "alternative worship," the service includes contemporary songs led by a live band, the inclusion of interactive media, extended time designated to greet other congregants and a sermon.

Departments and programs

Youth Department 
Village Presbyterian's youth department serves members of the church in middle and high school. The youth department hosts a variety of worship, mission and fellowship programs each week. Additionally, the department offers a variety of mission and worship-based trips during winter and summer school breaks, including an annual ski trip, a mission trip to the Dominican Republic, summer mission trip and annual trip to Montreat Conference Center.

Presbyterian Women 
Presbyterian Women are "all women members of the church and women in the community interested in the purpose of Presbyterian Women." The group hosts a variety of events for women in the church, including a Bible study, book club, and a sewing and knitting group. Presbyterian Women holds an annual Advent Candlelight Dinner, and sends out their own newsletter each month.

Music Ministry 
Village Presbyterian's music ministry includes several choral and instrumental ensembles for adults, youth, and children. The ministry includes the Village Choir and Chamber Choir, More Love Chorale, Alegria, Village Voices Youth Choir, Morning Stars Children’s Choir, Village Brass and Orchestra, Village Ringers and Morning Bells Handbell Choirs and the Village Players. The department presents a robust yearly concert series and maintains one of the most significant pipe organs in the region, Op. 22, built by Richards, Fowkes and Co. of Ooltewah, TN. The ministry is headed by Will Breytspraak, director, Dr. Elisa Bickers, principal organist and associate director, and Dr. Joshua Maize, associate director.

Mission and community involvement

Village Presbyterian Church Food Pantry 
Located off-site from the church itself, the Village Presbyterian Food Pantry hosts more than 300 volunteers each month. The pantry serves anyone in the area who completes an application and is near the Federal Poverty Guidelines. The pantry consists of a grocery-store-style area where clients receive provisions like bread, pasta, pastries, produce, and toiletries, as well as a clothes closet in which clients can get necessary items like dresses, shirts and undergarments.

Dominican Republic Partnership 
Doctors and nurses from the Village congregation as well as the Kansas City area make four annual trips to La Romana on a medical mission to provide health care to the impoverished residents of rural bateyes and urban barrios. The church's youth department began an annual spring break mission trip to La Romana in the 1990s to work on construction projects like the Joe Hartman School.

Front Porch Alliance 
Front Porch Alliance is a partnership between Village Church and the Ivanhoe neighborhood of Kansas City. Front Porch Alliance provides mentor programs, home repair, and career services to residents of the east side neighborhood. The program was founded in 1999.

Environmental Action Network 
The Environmental Action Committee was formed and renamed in 2007. The committee encourages the church to recycle, buy environmentally responsible products, make sure the church's facilities are maintained in an environmentally-friendly way, and assists in the education of the church about environmental issues.

Construction and rebuilding 
Village Presbyterian began reconstruction of the main church space in April 2015. The mission of the rebuild was to install a new organ, make the church's sanctuary more accessible for disabled congregants, and install a new entrance and welcome center. The sanctuary renovation was completed in December, 2015 and the new organ arrived in September 2016. The organ was played for the first time on Nov. 20, 2016 with just 5% of the organ pipes working. The organ was fully voiced and all 3,800 pipes were functioning by August 2017.

Pastors 
Rev. Tom Are, Jr., Co-Pastor (installed in February 2004 as senior pastor. After serving as senior pastor for 19 years, Tom became co-pastor with Rev. Dr. Rodger Nishioka in February 2023)
Rev. Dr. Rodger Nishioka, Co-Pastor (ordained in June 2018)
Rev. Zach Walker, Pastor of Youth Ministries (ordained and installed in August 2013)
Rev. Hallie Hottle, Pastor of Young Adult Ministry (installed June 2016)
Rev. Sally Wright, Pastor of Pastoral Care (installed January 2020)
Rev. Melanie Hardison, Pastor of Pastoral Care (installed February 2020)

References

External links 

http://villagepresyouth.org

Churches in Johnson County, Kansas
Presbyterian churches in Kansas
Presbyterian Church (USA) churches